Robert Spear Hudson, 1st Viscount Hudson,  (15 August 1886 – 2 February 1957) was a British Conservative Party politician who held a number of ministerial posts during World War II.

Diplomatic career 
He was the eldest son of Robert William Hudson who had inherited the substantial family soap business and sold it, and Gerda Frances Marion Bushell.  Hudson was educated at Eton College and Magdalen College, Oxford. He entered the Diplomatic Service in 1911, becoming an attaché and First Secretary at the British embassy in Washington. Hudson afterwards served as a diplomat in Russia.  

He had a particular interest in farming and was a member of the council of the Royal Agricultural Society.

M.P.
Hudson was elected as Member of Parliament (MP) for Whitehaven in 1924 and served there until losing in 1929. In 1931 he was returned for Southport. He served in several ministerial posts, becoming a Privy Counsellor in 1938. From 1937 to 1940, Hudson served as Secretary for Overseas Trade.

Mission to Moscow
On 8 March 1939, Hudson met Ivan Maisky, the Soviet ambassador to the court of St. James. Hudson in his account of his meeting wrote that Maisky had told him that he was "quite convinced that we, the British empire, were unable to stand up against German aggression, even with the assistance of France, unless we had the collaboration and help of Russia". Hudson replied that he did not share that assessment, saying that he believed that Britain and France were capable of defeating Germany on their own and did not need the help of the Soviet Union. Maisky in his account of the meeting stated that Hudson had told him that the Chamberlain had "firmly decided to maintain the empire and its position as a great power". Maisky had Hudson saying that Britain wanted allies and that: "Here in London, however, many people assured him [Hudson] that the USSR now did not want collaboration with the Western democracies, that it is inclined more and more to a policy of isolation, and that therefore it was pointless to seek a common language with Moscow". Maisky wrote that Hudson had told him that his upcoming visit to Moscow was meant to clarify "do we [the Soviets] want  or do we not want a rapprochement and collaboration with London". Maisky concluded: "Hence, Hudson's visit to Moscow could play a large role...Personally, Hudson would desire very much that this orientation moved on the line London-Paris-Moscow". Maisky concluded that Hudson was a very ambitious politician who wanted to be prime minister one day, "but I do not think Hudson could take the general line which he developed in today's discussion without the sanction of Chamberlain".

In March 1939, Hudson was scheduled to visit Germany to discuss improving Anglo-German trade, but in protest against the German violation of the Munich Agreement by occupying the Czech of Czecho-Slovakia on 15 March 1939, the visit was cancelled. Hudson was an appeaser who believed that improving Anglo-German economic relations was the key to saving the peace had very much looking forward to his visit to the Reich. 

On 23 March 1939, Hudson arrived in Moscow, ostensibly to negotiate an Anglo-Soviet trade treaty, but in fact to seek to improve Anglo-Soviet relations in light of the Danzig crisis. As was usually the case with foreign visitors, Hudson was not allowed to see Joseph Stalin in the Kremlin, and instead negotiated with Maxim Litvinov, the Commissar for Foreign Affairs. Hudson was one of the few ministers in the cabinet who spoke fluent Russian. After meeting him, Litvinov wrote to Stalin: "In view of the rejection of all our previous offers, we have no intention of making any new offers and it is up to others to take the initiative...In particular, we are ready now as we always have been, to co-operate with Britain. We are prepared to look at concrete suggestions". Hudson told Litvinov that the Munich Agreement had occurred because of British rearmament was still not complete, but that Britain was now far more advanced in its rearmament than it been in September 1938 as Hudson stated: "There will not be a second Munich". Litvinov stated that his government had been working for a policy of collective security under the banner of the League of Nations since 1934, and hinted that Stalin was losing interest in this policy. However, Litvinov told Hudson that his government "would be prepared to consult with H.M. Government and other governments regarding all suitable measures of resistance whether diplomatic or military or economic. He made it clear that he had in mind the possibility of resistance by force of arms". Litvinov went on to accuse the French Foreign Minister Georges Bonnet of wanting to leave Eastern Europe into the German sphere of influence as the price of keeping France out of another world war as Litvinov expressed much rage at Bonnet to Hudson.

Hudson's insistence that he was in Moscow to only discuss economic matters and his refusal to discuss Litvinov's suggestions of a military alliance doomed his visit to failure. Hudson told Litvinov that he was not convinced that an Anglo-Soviet military alliance was necessary and at one point angered Litvinov when he told him that Britain could do very well without trade with the Soviet Union. Litvinov accused Hudson of being a bully, saying that such threats to cease trade worked with small powers, and that the Soviet Union was a great power. In regard to the trade treaty, Hudson negotiated with Anastas Mikoyan, the Armenian Communist in charge of economic matters under Stalin.. No agreement was struck as both men sought the best possible economic treaty for their respective nations. Hudson also talked with Vladimir Potemkin, the deputy foreign commissar, where he spoke in general about a wish for an Anglo-French-Soviet alliance meant to deter Germany from choosing war. Hudson told Potemkin the lie that Britain was capable of sending 19 British Army divisions to France at once to face the Wehrmacht (in fact the British Army could only sent two divisions to France in March 1939). Potemkin wrote the Hudson mission was a failure because it "began without serious preparations". Potemkin compared Hudson to the character of Khlestakov, the protagonist of The Inspector-General, a 1836 play by Nikolai Gogol. Potemkin wrote that just as Khlestakov was a vain, lightweight man who persuaded people in a provincial Russian town that he was really the dreaded inspector-general of the Emperor Nicholas I whose task was to root all corruption and inefficiencyin the Russian empire, only to be finally exposed at the end as the unimportant man that really was, that likewise Hudson was just a hack politician who had no real authority to say anything important or even interesting on behalf of London who pretended to be someone important.   

Upon his return to London, Hudson offered a bleak assessment of the Soviet Union in a memo dated 4 April 1939 to the Foreign Secretary, Lord Halifax. Hudson wrote that "except where those [Soviet] interests happen to coincide with ours, that are likely a Government to prove an unreliable ally". Through not an expert in military matters, Hudson stated that he talked at length with the British military, air and naval attaches at the embassy in Moscow whose unanimous opinion was that the Soviet Union had an abysmally weak military and that "the Russians would be unable to wage an offensive without the regime breaking down". Hudson criticised the plans for better Anglo-Soviet relations to create a counterweight to Germany as unfeasible, which led him to argue that appeasement of the Reich was the only realistic solution to the present problems in Europe..

The Danzig crisis
On 17 July 1939, Helmuth Wohlthat, Hermann Göring's right-hand man in the Four Year Plan organisation, visited London to attend the meeting of the International Whaling Conference as part of the German delegation The next day, he and the German ambassador Herbert von Dirksen met Sir Horace Wilson, the Chief Industrial Adviser to the Government and one of the closest friends of Neville Chamberlain to discuss the Danzig crisis. Hudson attended the meetings as an aide to Wilson. On 20 July 1939, Hudson visited the German embassy to meet Dirksen and Wohlthat, acting on his own. Hudson, an extremely ambitious man who loved intrigue, was hoping to score a great success that would help his otherwise stalled career. Hudson kept detailed notes of his meeting at the German embassy with Wohlthat and Dirksen, where accordingly to him, he proposed a solution to the Danzig crisis. Hudson's notes have him saying that in exchange for a German promise not to invade Poland and ending the Anglo-German arms race, there would be a plan for the industrialists running the heavy industry of Germany, Britain and the United States to work together in the economic development of China, Eastern Europe and Africa; of a loan in sum of hundreds of millions for Germany to be floated in the City and on Wall Street; and some sort of plan for the "international governance" of Africa, by which he meant that Germany would given a role in the ruling of the African colonies of the European nations. At the time, it was widely accepted that colonies in Africa were necessary to allow the economies of European nations to function, and a major theme of Nazi propaganda was that it was "unjust" that the Treaty of Versailles had deprived the Reich of its African colonies. The repeated German demands for the return of the former German African colonies were a major issue in Anglo-German relations as the British government had no intention of returning the former German colonies. Wohlthat's account of the meeting had Hudson offering a British loan to the Reichsbank, a debt settlement for Germany, and a resolution of the question of the undervalued Reichmark versus the British pound sterling, none of which appears in Hudson's account of the meeting. Hudson ended his account by saying that if only Hitler would just learn to think in economic terms that much was possible.

After his meeting at the German embassy, Hudson was by all accounts in a state of euphoria, and he asked a group of journalists to come to his house to tell them "off-the-record" about what he had done. A preening Hudson-who believed that he had more or less single-handedly saved the world from the threat of another world war with his visit to the German Embassy-showed his notes of his visit to the embassy to the journalists, telling them it was he who just ended the Danzig crisis with his bold proposals for Anglo-German economic co-operation as Wohlthat was definitely interested in what he had to say. Hudson asked the journalists not to publish this story yet, saying more time was needed for his plan to work as Wohlthat had to return to Germany to report on his offer to Göring, who presumably would convince Hitler to accept it.  Two of the journalists present took the view that this was not "off-the-record" and decided to publish the story. Hudson who was described by another Conservative MP as "looks as through he just inherited a fortune and has been celebrating in a hot bath" boasted much about what he just done at a dinner party, speaking very loudly about his "peace-saving" plan. 

On 22 July 1939, The Daily Telegraph and the News Chronicle both broke the story on their front-pages that Britain just had offered Germany a loan worth hundreds of millions of pound sterling in exchange for not attacking Poland. The public reaction to this story was highly negative with much of the press calling Hudson's proposed loan "Danegeld". In order to stop raids of the Vikings, the kings of England had paid the "Danegeld" ("Dane money") to bribe the Danes not to attack. The term "paying the Danegeld" in England implies weakness and cowardice, that someone would rather bribe an enemy rather than stand up for himself, not the least because the Vikings would sometimes attack England even after the Danegeld had been paid. Hudson's offer of a loan to the Reich was felt to be rewarding Germany for threatening Poland, hence the "paying the Danegeld" references to his plan. Much to Hudson's humiliation, Chamberlain told the House of Commons that no such loan was being considered and that Hudson was speaking for himself. Chamberlain labelled Hudson a "conceited" junior minister "with a very bad reputation as a disloyal colleague who is always trying to advance his own interests". The Hudson loan offer proved to be greatly damaging, especially when it emerged that Wilson had met in secret with Wohlthat, which gave the Hudson-Wohlthat meeting a "demi-semi-official air" as Chamberlain put it. Chamberlain wrote in a letter to his sister about the Hudson affair "all the busybodies in London, Paris, and Burgos have put two & two together and triumphantly made five".  However, Hudson was able to sell exclusive to the Daily Express newspaper owned by Lord Beaverbrook his account of the loan talks, which were published under the title: "I Planned the Peace Loan to Germany". Gladwyn Jebb, the private secretary to Sir Alexander Cadogan, the Permanent Undersecretary at the Foreign Office, wrote in a furious memo that Hudson's loan offer was "super-appeasement" as he declared that the publication of the plan: "would arose all the suspicions of the Bolsheviks, dishearten the Poles, and encourage the Germans into thinking that we are prepared to buy peace...I must say I doubt whatever such folly could be pushed to a further extreme". Despite the humiliation, Hudson remained convinced that "another Munich" to save the peace was still possible under which the Free City of Danzig (modern Gdańsk) would "go home to the Reich" in exchange for Germany not invading Poland. Hudson-who was unaware of the Y-day date for Fall Weiss (set for 26 August and later pushed back to 1 September 1939-kept saying that all he needed was "a little more time" to save the peace..

Minister
In April 1940, Hudson was briefly appointed the Minister of Shipping, before on 14 May becoming Minister of Agriculture and Fisheries, in the Churchill war ministry, a post he would hold until the 1945 election. In the opinion of Edward Turnour, 6th Earl Winterton, Hudson "was by far the best of Ministers of Agriculture in either war...he was determined to see that farmers and landowners alike utilised every acre of soil to help keep the nation from starvation". Churchill was dissatisfied with the current agriculture minister, Reginald Dorman-Smith, who was very close to the farmers' lobby, and replaced him with Hudson, who was an advocate of a "scientific" approach to agriculture. Hudson favored using the latest scientific methods to improve agricultural productivity with no regard for traditional farming methods, an approach that Dorman-Smith was opposed to. Hudson, besides for his advocacy of a "scientific" approach, also favored a "nutritional" approach under enough food which would be produced to supply essential nutritionals, a plan that Dorman-Smith was opposed. Dorman-Smith had once been the president of the National Farmers Union, and in common with many British farmers resented the idea of university-educated experts telling farmers how to best manage their farms. Dorman-Smith disliked the "nutritional" approach, saying "once we fall into the nutritional trap, we are trapped". For an example, Dorman-Smith was opposed to pasteurised milk under the grounds that British people had drank unpateurised milk for thousands of years, and he saw no reason for any change.In the winter of 1939-1940, Dorman-Smith had "different conclusions" about agriculture with Winston Churchill, who was serving as the First Lord of Admiralty, and upon becoming prime minister on 10 May 1940, Churchill sacked Dorman-Smith on 14 May. Hudson's career had benefitted from his friendship with Robert Boothby who had once served as Churchill's parliamentary secretary and who recommended him as Agriculture minister to Churchill.          

A major problem for Britain in World War Two was the number of British people vastly exceeded the agricultural capacity of British farms, which thus required Britain to import food to prevent a famine. In 1938, 70% of all the food consumed in Britain came from abroad while only 30% of the food came from British farms. A major aim for Germany in the Second World just as in the First World War was to have the U-boats sink enough shipping to cut off Britain and induce a famine that would force the British to sue for peace. On 28 June 1940, a Scientific Committee appointed by Hudson recommended "a basal diet" as the "foundation of food policy" in view of the possibility of an U-boat-caused famine. The Committee advised that a diet of 2, 000 calories per day for every British person would be sufficient to keep the population alive and allow war production to continue. The "basal diet" advised was a mixture of vegetables (especially potatoes), bread, fats (butter and cooking fats), milk and oatmeal. The "basal diet" that was imposed was made possible by extensive rationing.   

As Agriculture minister, Hudson strove to make British farming more productive to make up for the food shortages caused by the U-boat campaign. In April 1939, Britain had imposed peacetime conscription for the first time ever in British history, and to make up for the farmers conscripted, the Women's Land Army had been created in June 1939. Upon becoming Agriculture Minister, Hudson played a major role in expanding the Women's Land Army to send thousands of "Land Girls" to the countryside to work the farms. Many of the "Land Girls" as women serving in the Women's Land Army were called complained that their efforts were not being taken seriously and that the male civil servants of the Ministry of Agriculture treated them in a very patronising fashion. The stories of the contempt that the "Land Girls" were being shown drove down the number of women willing to join the Women's Land Army. Hudson argued that with many British farmers and farmhands serving in the military that the "Land Girls" were essential to provide the necessary workers to expand the productivity of British agriculture and ordered his civil servants to be more respectful of the "Land Girls". 

Besides for the "Land Girls", Hudson had German and Italian POWs; Jewish refugees; serviceman on furlough who had been farmers before the war; conscientious objectors; and volunteers from the cities all put to work on British farms. Hudson especially favored the use of Italian POWs as rural laborers because many of the many Italian servicemen taken prisoner came from the rural areas of Italy and were experienced farmers. Owing to the disinclination of many Italians to fight for the Fascist regime and serious morale problems in the Italian military, by 1943 British forces had captured over half million Italians, making the Italians easily the largest group of Axis POWs in British custody, vastly outnumbering the German and Japanese POWs. Starting in 1941, Italians captured in the campaigns in North Africa and East Africa were shipped to the United Kingdom to serve as rural labor and by 1944, there were 150,000 Italian POWs working on British farms. Besides the fact that many of the Italian POWs came from rural areas, it was believed by British officials that the Italian POWs were less likely to cause problems with the British rural communities than the German POWs.     

In 1943, Hudson's work together with Lord Woolton and Lord Leathers was lauded by the Canadian journalist Robert Thurlow as a "success story". Thurlow wrote: "This is the story of three men who supply, and operate, what is probably the world's biggest store". From 1939 to 1943, the amount of arable acreage in Britain increased from 12 million acres to 18 million acres. More importantly, by 1943, 60% of the food consumed in the United Kingdom came from British farms, which lessened the dependence of imported food while freeing up shipping to bring in other supplies.

Hudson was created Viscount Hudson in 1952.

Books

References

External links 

 

Hudson, Robert Spear, 1st Viscount
Hudson, Robert Spear, 1st Viscount
Agriculture ministers of the United Kingdom
Hudson, Robert Spear, 1st Viscount
British diplomats
Hudson, Robert Hudson, 1st Viscount
Conservative Party (UK) hereditary peers
Hudson, Robert Spear, 1st Viscount
Hudson, Robert Spear, 1st Viscount
Ministers in the Chamberlain peacetime government, 1937–1939
Ministers in the Chamberlain wartime government, 1939–1940
Ministers in the Churchill caretaker government, 1945
Ministers in the Churchill wartime government, 1940–1945
Viscounts created by George VI
Hudson, Robert Spear, 1st Viscount
UK MPs 1924–1929
UK MPs 1931–1935
UK MPs 1935–1945
UK MPs 1945–1950
UK MPs 1950–1951
UK MPs 1951–1955
UK MPs who were granted peerages